Kenrick Edisbury (1670?–1736), of Deptford, Kent and Gresford, Denbighshire, was an English Member of Parliament.

He was a Member (MP) of the Parliament of Great Britain for Harwich from 24 January 1709 to 1713.

References

1670 births
1736 deaths
Year of birth uncertain
18th-century English people
18th-century Welsh people
People from Deptford
People from Denbighshire
Members of the Parliament of Great Britain for English constituencies
British MPs 1708–1710
British MPs 1710–1713